John Norman Hughes (10 July 1921 – 31 August 2003) was an English professional footballer who played in the Football League for Birmingham City.

Born in Tamworth, Staffordshire, Hughes made his name in non-league football during the Second World War. A versatile player, he joined Birmingham City in June 1947, and made his debut on 6 September 1947 in a 2–1 home win against Luton Town in the Second Division. He played twice more that season at outside right, and a further three times at outside left in the 1948–49 First Division season, but then returned to the non-league game with Tamworth and then with Atherstone Town. In 1955 he was appointed assistant manager of Tamworth.

References

1921 births
2003 deaths
Sportspeople from Tamworth, Staffordshire
English footballers
Association football outside forwards
Birmingham City F.C. players
Tamworth F.C. players
Atherstone Town F.C. players
English Football League players